= Museum of the Independence Movement, Kraków =

Museum in Kraków, Poland

Muzeum Czynu Niepodległościowego
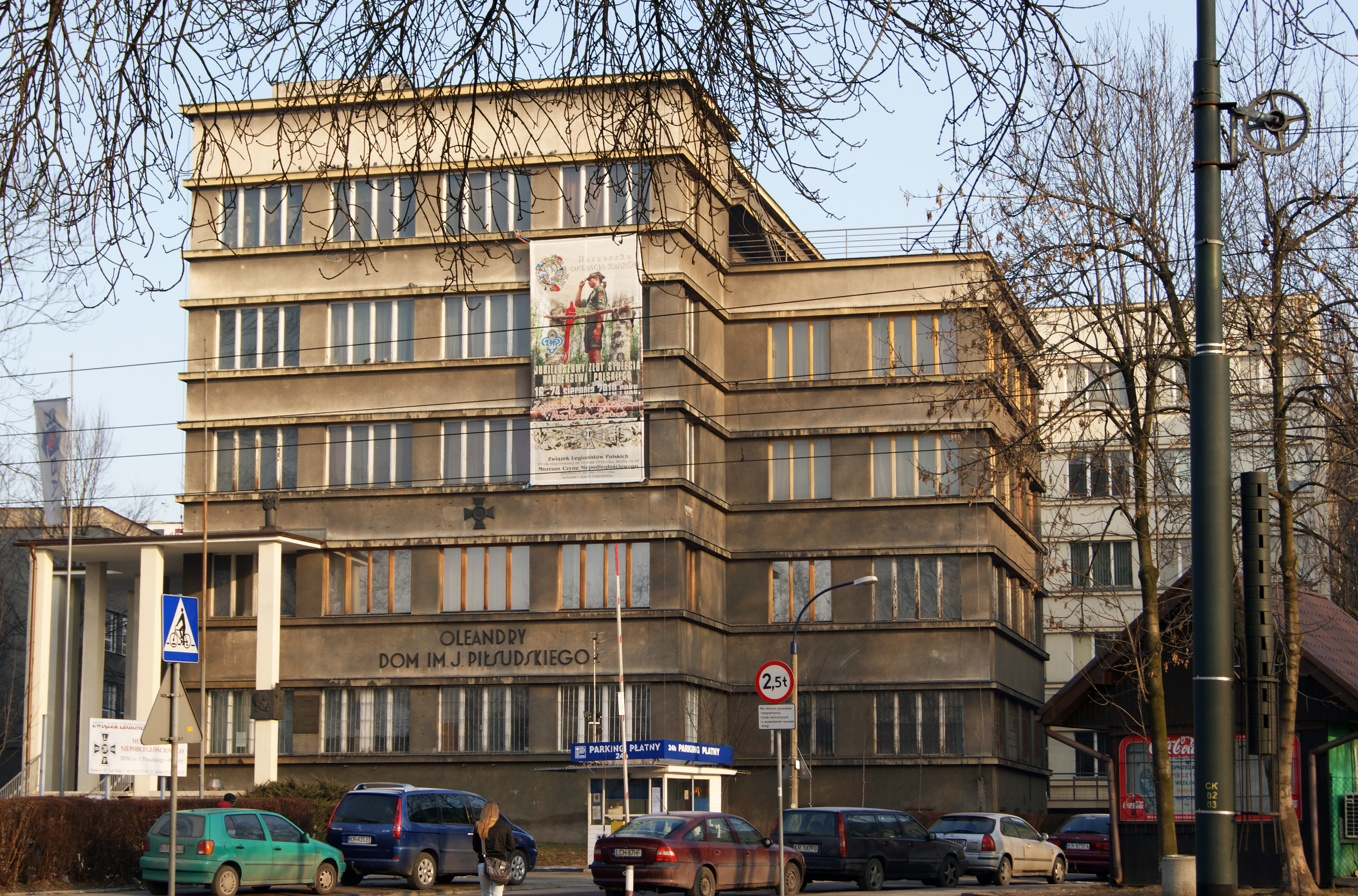
- Established: 1922
- Location: Poland
- Coordinates: 50°03′38″N 19°55′15″E
- Location of Museum of the Independence Movement, Kraków

Muzeum Czynu Niepodległościowego is a museum in Kraków, Poland. It was established in 1922.
